The D.V. Adams Co.-Bussell and Weston Building is a historic commercial building at 190 Water Street in downtown Augusta, Maine.  Built in 1909, it is one of the state's best early examples of a department store building.  The building was listed on the National Register of Historic Places in 1986.

Description and history
The D.V.Adams Co.-Bussell and Weston Building is located on the west side of Water Street, Augusta's principal business thoroughfare, on the block south of Bridge Street.  It is a three-story brick structure, with a flat roof adorned by an ornate projecting cornice.  It is five bays wide, with the bays articulated by pilasters, and the first-floor display windows separated from the upper floors by a stylized entablature.  The central bay is wider than the others, housing the recessed building entrance on the ground floor, and three-part windows on the upper floors with slender pilasters dividing the sections.  The interior retains original decorative features, including iron columns, a wooden staircase, and pressed metal ceilings.

The building was designed by the Boston, Massachusetts firm of Freeman, Funk and Wilcox, and was built in 1909 for Bussell & Weston, a dry goods retailer.  The building is a notable departure from the commercial Italianate architecture that predominates on Water Street.  It originally had a stepped parapet, which was replaced c. 1919-1926 with the present Italianate cornice, bringing it more in sympathy with its neighbors.  The building housed a department store until 1985.

See also
National Register of Historic Places listings in Kennebec County, Maine

References

Commercial buildings on the National Register of Historic Places in Maine
Neoclassical architecture in Maine
Buildings and structures completed in 1909
Buildings and structures in Augusta, Maine
National Register of Historic Places in Augusta, Maine